Lalo Kile is one of the woredas in the Oromia Region of Ethiopia. It is part of the Kelem Welega Zone. Lalo Kile is bordered on the south by the Illubabor Zone, on the west by Dale Sedi, and on the north and east by Mirab Welega Zone. The administrative center of this woreda is Lalo. Lalo Kile was separated from former Dale Lalo woreda.

Demographics 
The 2007 national census reported a total population for this woreda of 51,448, of whom 25,410 were men and 26,038 were women; 2,805 or 5.45% of its population were urban dwellers. The majority of the inhabitants were Protestants, with 73.79% reporting that as their religion, while 19.28% observed Ethiopian Orthodox Christianity, and 5.78% observed Islam.

Notes 

Districts of Oromia Region